USS Bullhead (SS-332), a Balao-class submarine, was the last US Navy ship sunk by enemy action during World War II, probably on the same day that an atomic bomb was dropped on Hiroshima. She was the only ship of the United States Navy to be named for the bullhead (any large-headed fish, especially the catfish, miller's thumb, and sculpin).

Construction and commissioning
Bullhead′s keel was laid down by the Electric Boat Company of Groton, Connecticut.  She was launched on 16 July 1944 sponsored by Mrs. Howard R. Doyle, and commissioned 4 December 1944.

Operations 
Bullhead served in the Pacific Theater of Operations during World War II.

The war operations of Bullhead extended from 21 March to August 1945 during which time she completed two war patrols. Her area of operations included the Java Sea and South China Sea and the Gulf of Siam.

First patrol 
During the greater portion of her first war patrol Bullhead performed lifeguard services and on two occasions bombarded Pratas Island, China, damaging enemy radio installations. She also rescued three airmen from a downed B-29 Superfortress following an airstrike on the China coast. Bullhead suffered no damage or casualties. On 19 April, an Allied aircraft — probably another U.S. Army Air Forces B-24 Liberator, mistakenly dropped two depth charges on Bullhead as she submerged in the South China Sea. The depth charges detonated as Bullhead reached . She suffered no damage or casualties.

Second patrol 
On her second patrol, in May and June 1945 in the Gulf of Siam and the South China Sea, Bullhead sank two small freighters, a schooner and a sub chaser totaling 1800 tons and damaged two more sub chasers and another small freighter, all in gun actions.

Third patrol and sinking 

On 31 July 1945 Bullhead left Fremantle submarine base, Western Australia to commence her third war patrol.

Bullhead reported on 6 August that she had passed through Lombok Strait.  That was the last word received from Bullhead.  On 12 August, Capitaine, planning to arrive on 13 August, ordered Bullhead to take position the following day in a scouting line with Capitaine and Puffer.  Receiving no reply, Capitaine reported on 15 August, "Have been unable to contact Bullhead by any means since arriving in area."

However, one occurred on 6 August 1945, when a Mitsubishi Ki-51 from the 73rd Independent Chutai (literally "company" or squadron) of the Imperial Japanese Army Air Force attacked with depth charges. It claimed two direct hits, and for ten minutes thereafter, there was a great amount of gushing oil and air bubbles rising in the water. Since the position given is very near the Balinese coast, it is presumed that the proximity of mountain peaks shortened Bullhead'''s radar range and prevented her from receiving a warning of the plane's approach. 84 men were lost while serving on USS Bullhead during her service.

 Honors and awards Bullhead received two battle stars for her World War II service.

Commemoration

In August 2022, on the 76th anniversary of the submarine's sinking, a new memorial for USS Bullhead'' was unveiled at the Western Australian Maritime Museum, Fremantle, Western Australia  in the presence of the U.S. Consul General David Gainer.

See also
 List of U.S. Navy losses in World War II

References

Citations

Bibliography
 Hinman, Charles R., and Douglas E. Campbell. The Submarine Has No Friends: Friendly Fire Incidents Involving U.S. Submarines During World War II. Syneca Research Group, Inc., 2019. .

External links 

On Eternal Patrol: USS Bullhead
 Kill Record:  USS Bullhead

Balao-class submarines
World War II submarines of the United States
Ships built in Groton, Connecticut
World War II shipwrecks in the Java Sea
Shipwrecks of Indonesia
1944 ships
Friendly fire incidents of World War II
Maritime incidents in April 1945
Maritime incidents in August 1945
Submarines sunk by aircraft
Ships lost with all hands
Ships sunk by Japanese aircraft
Lost submarines of the United States